James Miller was a Scottish footballer who played as a right half, mainly for Sheffield Wednesday, Airdrieonians and St Mirren.

References

Year of birth unknown
Year of death unknown
19th-century births
20th-century deaths
Footballers from Glasgow
Association football wing halves
Scottish footballers
St Mirren F.C. players
Airdrieonians F.C. (1878) players
St Bernard's F.C. players
Maryhill F.C. players
Sheffield Wednesday F.C. players
Scottish Football League players
English Football League players
Scottish Junior Football Association players